Erra Matti Dibbalu also called as Red Sand Hills, a notified National Geo-heritage Monument, is situated at the outskirts of Visakhapatnam City. It is located very near to the Bay of Bengal and is one of Visakhapatnam's many heritage sites.

About
These Erra Matti Dibbalu are nature's assets to Visakhapatnam. The Geological Survey of India is helping to make these sites attain geo-heritage site status.

References

Tourist attractions in Visakhapatnam
Geography of Visakhapatnam
Uttarandhra
National Geological Monuments in India